John Harry Hampshire (10 February 1941 – 1 March 2017), also known as Jack Hampshire, was an English cricketer and umpire, who played eight Tests and three One Day Internationals (ODIs) for England between 1969 and 1975. He played first-class cricket for Yorkshire from 1961 to 1981, and for Derbyshire from 1982 to 1984. Overseas, he was a successful captain of Tasmania in the period before the state was included in the Sheffield Shield. He was also appointed President of Yorkshire County Cricket Club in 2016, serving until his death.

Cricket writer Colin Bateman remarked, "Hampshire thrilled English cricket supporters when he scored a century at Lord's on his Test debut – a unique achievement for an England player. An attractive middle-order stroke-player, Hampshire looked one for the future but he was dropped after one more match".

Early life
Born on 10 February 1941 in Thurnscoe, Hampshire came from a cricketing family. His father, John, played for Yorkshire in 1937. His younger brother, Alan, also played for Yorkshire in 1975.

Playing career
Hampshire made his debut for his native Yorkshire at the age of 20 in 1961, where he had a twenty-year career with the club.

Between 1969 and 1975 he played 8 Tests for England, scoring 403 runs. On his debut against the West Indies at Lord's, he made a dashing 107 and he appeared set for a glittering Test career. He was the first Englishman to score a Test hundred on debut at Lord's. Strangely, he was dropped after the next match, and faded away from the Test arena, making just half-a-dozen more Test appearances for England.

After the ousting of Geoff Boycott from the Yorkshire captaincy, Hampshire captained the club for two seasons from 1979 to 1980. The two had previously clashed, and in the last season of Boycott's captaincy, Hampshire had staged a 'go-slow' at Northampton – which cost Yorkshire a bonus point – as a protest against slow batting by his long-time rival. He left Yorkshire in 1981 during one of the county's then almost perennial bouts of civil war, and during the winter played for a Leicestershire team as a guest in Zimbabwe. In 1982 he joined Derbyshire where he stayed for three years.

Hampshire played for Tasmania for five years under the captaincy of Jack Simmons. He made his Sheffield Shield debut with Tasmania in their first season in 1977–78. He was a member of Tasmania's 1978–79 Gillette Cup-winning squad.

Hampshire was a powerful stroke maker in the middle order, especially strong off the front foot. He scored 28,059 runs in 577 first-class matches at 34.55, including 43 centuries, with a highest score of 183 not out. He added another 7,314 runs in 280 one day matches with a best of 119 at 31.12. He was a brave close fielder who took 446 catches in his first-class career. He was seen as potentially useful leg spinner, taking 7 for 52 against Glamorgan in 1963.

Umpiring career
After retiring from the playing arena, Hampshire became a county umpire in 1985. He was then appointed to the Test list in 1989, and later in 1999 he was added to the ICC panel of umpires. Hampshire stood in his first Test match as an umpire at Old Trafford during the 1989 Ashes. He remained a highly respected umpire on the first-class circuit until his retirement in 2005. He stood in 21 Tests and 20 One-day Internationals. He umpired the final of the last Benson and Hedges Cup competition in 2002 with Barry Dudleston, thirty years after having played against Dudleston in the first final of that competition held in 1972.

Coaching career
Hampshire coached Zimbabwe in its first Test against India in 1992.

Death
Hampshire died at the age of 76 on 1 March 2017, after a long illness.

See also
 List of Test cricket umpires
 List of One Day International cricket umpires

References

External links

1941 births
2017 deaths
Commonwealth XI cricketers
Cricketers who made a century on Test debut
Derbyshire cricketers
England One Day International cricketers
England Test cricketers
English cricketers
English Test cricket umpires
English One Day International cricket umpires
International Cavaliers cricketers
Leicestershire cricketers
Marylebone Cricket Club cricketers
People from Thurnscoe
Presidents of Yorkshire County Cricket Club
Sportspeople from Yorkshire
Tasmania cricketers
Yorkshire cricket captains
Yorkshire cricketers
D. B. Close's XI cricketers
D. H. Robins' XI cricketers
T. N. Pearce's XI cricketers
Young England cricketers
Coaches of the Zimbabwe national cricket team